{{Speciesbox
|image = Naturalis Biodiversity Center - RMNH.MOL.287882 - Rhynchotrochus rollsianus (Smith, 1887) - Camaenidae - Mollusc shell.jpeg
|image_caption = 
|taxon = Rhynchotrochus rollsianus
|authority = (E.A.Smith, 1887))
|synonyms_ref = 
|synonyms =
 Helix (Papuina) rollsiana E.A.Smith, 1887
 Papuina rollsiana E.A.Smith, 1887
 Rhynchotrochus (Rhynchotrochus) rollsianus (E. A. Smith, 1887)· accepted, alternate representation
 Volenga rollsiana (E.A.Smith, 1887) 
}}Rhynchotrochus rollsianus is a species of land snail in the family Camaenidae. 

It was first described by Edgar Albert Smith in 1887 as Helix (Papuina) rollsiana.
 

A later (detailed) redescription (in Latin, in 1897) of a specimen from Ferguson Island in the D'Entrecasteaux Archipeligo, is given by Wilhelm Kobelt and others. In 1941 Tom Iredale ascribed it to the new genus, Volenga, to give the new name, Volenga rollsiana''.

Description 
The shell is depressed, with a rounded periphery. It is broader than tall and the shell has a violet mottling.

Distribution 
This species has been found in Papua New Guinea.

Gallery

References

External links
 Clench, W. J.; Turner, R. D. (1966). Monograph of the genus Rhynchotrochus (Papuininae: Camaenidae). Journal of the Malacological Society of Australia. 1(9): 59-95

Camaenidae
Gastropods described in 1887
Taxa named by Edgar Albert Smith
Fauna of Papua New Guinea